Montepescali railway station is an Italian railway station on the Tirrenica railway line, located in the village of Braccagni, at the bottom of the hill of Montepescali, near the city of Grosseto. It serves as a junction for services on the Siena-Grosseto line that connect here and follow the main line south into Grosseto.

History
The station opened on 15 June 1864 along with the section of the Tirrenica railway from Follonica to Orbetello. In 1872, the original Siena-Grosseto railway was constructed, with trains running to Monte Antico, before following the Asciano-Monte Antico line to Asciano, and the Central Tuscan line into Siena. In 1927, a new line was opened that connected Monte Antico and Siena via Buonconvento. In 1994, services on the Asciano-Monte Antico railway ceased, leaving the sole connection along the Siena-Grosseto railway from Montepescali as the line direct to Siena. The Tirrenica railway has continuously seen traffic since 1874 without interruption.

Train services and movements
Regular passenger services to the station consist of regionale and regionale veloce services, which run frequently to Grosseto, Pisa Centrale, Roma Termini, Campiglia Marittima and Florence SMN. Passenger services on the Siena-Grosseto railway are all regionale classification and run primarily to Grosseto and Siena, and in early mornings and evenings to Empoli and Florence.

Gallery

See also

History of rail transport in Italy
List of railway stations in Tuscany
Rail transport in Italy
Railway stations in Italy

References 

Railway stations in Tuscany
1864 establishments in Italy
Grosseto
Railway stations in Italy opened in the 19th century